Erin's Isle refers to the island of Ireland.

Erin's Isle or Erins Isle may also refer to:

Erins Isle (horse), a thoroughbred racehorse that competed in Ireland and the United States
Erins Isle GAA, a Gaelic Athletic Association club in Finglas, Dublin
HMS Erin's Isle, formerly PS Erin's Isle, a paddle steamer built in 1912

See also
Far From Erin's Isle, a 1912 American silent film
Erin (disambiguation)